The High Coast is a part of the coast of Sweden on the Gulf of Bothnia, in the Ångermanland province of northeast Sweden, centered in the area of the municipalities of Kramfors, Härnösand, Sollefteå and Örnsköldsvik. It is notable as an area for research on post-glacial rebound and eustacy, in which the land rises as the covering glaciers melt, a phenomenon first recognised and studied there. Since the last ice age, the land has risen 300 meters, which accounts for the region's unusually tall cliffs. The High Coast is part of the Swedish/Finnish High Coast/Kvarken Archipelago UNESCO World Heritage Site because of its exceptional geology and unique example of isostatic rebound.

Geology
The relief of the High Coast is that of a large scale joint valley terrain that dissects uplifted remnants of the Sub-Cambrian peneplain. 

During the Ice Ages of the past 2-3 million years, the High Coast was repeatedly covered by continental ice sheet, including the Fennoscandian ice sheet until roughly 9600 years ago. When the glaciers retreated from the High Coast, the ground, which had been compacted by the weight of the ice sheet, went through rapid uplift, a process known as isostatic rebound. This rebound cause uplift of roughly 285 meters, the highest known isostatic rebound on Earth. The region is still rising, on the order of 8 mm per year. Remains of the former shorelines can be seen along the High Coast.  

Some of the fish species found in the High Coast are relict species from the most recent ice age, including the Fourhorn sculpin. Other animal species resident to the high coast include brown bears, lynx, and moose.

History
The area known today as Höga Kusten has historically been known as the Ångermanland Coast. In 1974, the term High Coast was coined in connection with a report on the area.

In 2000, UNESCO put the area on the World Heritage List: "The High Coast site affords outstanding opportunities for the understanding of the important processes that formed the glaciated and land uplift areas of the Earth's surface." In 2006, the High Coast was joined with the Finnish Kvarken areas. The World Heritage Site ranges from the High Coast Bridge (Swedish: Högakustenbron) in the South to Skagsudde in the North.

Attractions
The most popular places to visit in the High Coast of Sweden are Skule Mountain, Skuleskogen National Park, and the islands Ulvön and Trysunda.

The High Coast of Sweden is considered to be excellent for hiking and has been cited as one of the best hiking regions in Sweden.

Both outdoor magazines (such as Utemagasinet and Outside) and daily newspapers (such as Svenska Dagbladet) rank the High Coast Trail as one of the best of Sweden's hiking trails.

The High Coast Trail is a 128-kilometer long trail along the High Coast. For day hikes, Skule Mountain and Skule National park are popular. The High Coast Hike (Höga Kusten Hike) is an annual event considered suitable for both experienced and new hikers.

The Höga Kusten Bridge is an impressive gateway to the region, while there are a number of picturesque islands and fishing villages in the area.

Tastes 
The High Coast is also famous for several different types of foods and drinks. 

High Coast Whisky, have received many World Whiskies Award, and have been nominated to the best whisky in the World. Located by the stream of Ångermanälven, it uses the nature and the cold water in its processes. 

Hernö Gin, have been voted as the World's best Gin every year since 2015 and the Founder and Master Distiller Jon Hillgren has been voted into the Gin Hall of Fame. Hernö Gin opened Sweden's first ever gin distillery.

References

Bibliography
Bergström, Lars (1975). Höga kusten: natur, människor och tradition längs kusten från Sundsvall till Örnsköldsvik - ett av Sveriges vackraste och mest särpräglade landskap   Stockholm : Bonniers 1975 80pp (The High Coast: the landscape, people and traditions along the coast from Sundsvall to Örnsköldsvik - one of Sweden's most beautiful and distinctive landscapes) (Swedish)

External links

 Höga Kusten tourism website
High Coast/Kvarken Archipelago World Heritage Site's official website
 High Coast Hike - Annual Hiking Event
 Skuleskogen Nationalpark website
 Skule Mountain - Visitor Guide
 Ulvön Island - Visitor Guide
 Höga Kusten Bridge
Västernorrland County Museum Website
 UNESCO World Heritage profile

Ångermanland
Landforms of Västernorrland County
Landforms of Sweden
Coasts of the Baltic Sea
World Heritage Sites in Sweden